Cayambe is an agricultural service city (population 39,028 at the last census on November 28, 2010) in highland Ecuador. It lies at the foot of the Cayambe volcano. While the city is mainly peopled by mestizos, the surrounding rural population is primarily composed of indigenous people who are mainly involved in subsistence agriculture, dairy farming and procurement of lumber. It is the third-largest city in Pichincha Province.

History
Cayambe's indigenous people of today are descendants of the pre-Inca Kayambi people. The Kayambi were resistant to Inca expansion and were only definitively conquered by Huayna Capac (the eleventh Sapa Inca of the Inca Empire) after a bloody 20-year war. At that time, the Kayambi people adopted the Kichwa language, a dialect of the Quechua family of languages. Not long afterwards, in the 16th century, the first Spanish conquistadores arrived in the region. Kichwa survives in some of the hamlets today, while in others it has given way to Spanish.

Government
The town of Cayambe is the seat of the canton of Cayambe.

Industry
The area hosts numerous flower plantations, whose products are destined for the overseas cut flower market. Among the local food products, better known are cheese and biscochos de Cayambe (a crumbly biscuit).

Points of interest near Cayambe
 A globe monument, known as "La Bola de Guachalá" (The Ball), located on the Pan-American Highway in the village of Buena Esperanza.
 The Quitsato Sundial, located in the village of Buena Esperanza, is among the most accurate places in the world created to determine equator position.
 Hacienda Guachalá, located in the village of Buena Esperanza, is the oldest hacienda in Ecuador.
 Castillo de Guachalá, an eclectic-style castle located in the village of Cuniburo.
 the waterfalls of Cariacu.
 the virgin forests of Paquiestancia.
 the archeological museum near Puntazil.

Gallery

See also
 Quitsato Sundial
 Dolores Cacuango, indigenous activist from Cayambe
Paquiestancia community and virgin forests

References

External links
 https://web.archive.org/web/20090226040737/http://www.municipiocayambe.gov.ec/

Populated places in Pichincha Province